The Premio Reverberi (or Oscar del Basket) is a basketball prize that is awarded annually by the city of Quattro Castella, Italy, in collaboration with the Italian Basketball Federation and the Lega Basket, which is the organizing body of Italy's top-tier level professional basketball league, the LBA. It is dedicated to the memory of the late Italian basketball referee Pietro Reverberi.

Awards are given each year for the categories of Best Head coach, Best Male Player, Best Female Player, and Best Referee in Italian basketball.

Winners

References

Lega Basket Serie A awards
European basketball awards